The women's 100 metres event at the 1995 Summer Universiade was held on 31 August – 1 September at the Hakatanomori Athletic Stadium in Fukuoka, Japan.

Medalists

Results

Heats
Qualification: First 4 of each heat (Q) and the next 8 fastest qualified for the quarterfinals.

Wind:Heat 1: +0.8 m/s, Heat 2: +0.4 m/s, Heat 3: +0.6 m/s, Heat 4: -1.8 m/s, Heat 5: -1.2 m/s, Heat 6: +0.7 m/s

Quarterfinals
Qualification: First 4 of each heat qualified directly (Q) for the semifinals.

Wind:Heat 1: +1.0 m/s, Heat 2: -1.1 m/s, Heat 3: -0.4 m/s, Heat 4: -2.2 m/s

Semifinals
Qualification: First 4 of each semifinal qualified directly (Q) for the final.

Wind:Heat 1: +0.5 m/s, Heat 2: +1.9 m/s

Final
Wind: -0.7 m/s

References

Athletics at the 1995 Summer Universiade
1995 in women's athletics
1995